On 28 April 2007, at least 28 people were killed and about 52 others wounded in a suicide bombing at a political rally in Charsadda, North-West Frontier Province, Pakistan. The injured included Interior Minister Aftab Ahmad Khan Sherpao. Shortly before the bomber detonated his explosive belt, security guards stopped him from getting closer to Sherpao, whom he was three metres (10 feet) away from at the time of the explosion.

Charsadda later suffered major insurgent attacks in December 2007, February 2008, May 2011, January 2016 and February 2017.

See also
Terrorist incidents in Pakistan in 2007

References

2007 murders in Pakistan
2000s crimes in Khyber Pakhtunkhwa
21st-century mass murder in Pakistan
April 2007 crimes
April 2007 events in Pakistan
Failed assassination attempts in Asia
April 2007 bombing
Mass murder in 2007
Mass murder in Khyber Pakhtunkhwa
North-West Frontier Province
Suicide bombings in 2007
Suicide bombings in Khyber Pakhtunkhwa
Terrorist incidents in Pakistan in 2007